Diogo Pacheco de Amorim (born 10 March 1949 in Lisbon) is a Portuguese politician of the Chega and since 2022 a member of the Assembly of the Republic representing Porto.

Biography
De Amorim was born in Lisbon in 1949 and is the grandson of a monarchist politician close to António de Oliveira Salazar. He studied philosophy at Coimbra University. During his time as a student, he was active in the Independent Movement for the National Reconstruction / Party of the Portuguese Right and organizations that contested decolonization. He later became an advisor to deputy Prime Minister Diogo Freitas do Amaral.

In 2019, de Amorim left the CDS – People's Party of which he had been a longstanding member and joined Chega. Between 9 September and 8 October 2021 he was appointed as deputy to the Assembly of the Republic, replacing Chega leader André Ventura who temporarily resigned to oversee the municipal elections that year. In his maiden speech, he paid tribute to former president Jorge Sampaio.

During the 2022 Portuguese legislative election, de Amorim was returned to the Assembly as a deputy for the Porto constituency.

In his political beliefs, de Amorim has called himself a liberal conservative. He calls for a “depoliticization” of the education system and the right to give families the primacy of transmitting social values to children. According to him, schools should be concerned with consolidating the “Judeo-Christian” and civic “cultural and civilizational values”, including “discipline and respect for elders, teachers, authority.” de Amorim has also called for Portugal's departure from the United Nations, as according to him it is "an agency for the dissemination of cultural Marxism and mass globalism." He also supports stricter laws on the granting of Portuguese citizenship and for zero tolerance policies on illegal immigration, but supports legal immigration and compulsory policies for immigrants to work and not be allowed to claim social security benefits until after a certain period.

Following the Russian invasion of Ukraine, de Amorim called on the Portuguese government to support Ukraine and condemned the Portuguese Communist Party, stating PCP's stance is “at least ambiguous and at most clearly reprehensible." He also argued Portugal should boost its defense spending following the invasion.

References

Portuguese politicians
21st-century Portuguese politicians
Chega politicians
Members of the Assembly of the Republic (Portugal)
Living people

1949 births